Gregory L. Boso is a Republican member of the West Virginia Senate, representing the 11th district from January 16, 2015, until his resignation on September 26, 2019, after accepting a job with a forensic engineering firm.

Election results

References

1957 births
Living people
American civil engineers
People from Gassaway, West Virginia
People from Summersville, West Virginia
Republican Party West Virginia state senators
West Virginia University Institute of Technology alumni
Baptists from West Virginia
21st-century American politicians